James Baird Dawkins (November 14, 1820 – February 12, 1883) was a prominent Confederate politician. He was born in Union County, (now Cherokee County) South Carolina and later moved to Florida. He represented that state in the First Confederate Congress until he resigned on  December 8, 1862. Afterwards he served as a state court judge in Florida 1863 to 1865 and 1877 to 1883.

References

External links
 politicalgraveyard.com

1820 births
1883 deaths
Florida state court judges
Members of the Confederate House of Representatives from Florida
19th-century American politicians
19th-century American judges